The deportation of the Soviet Greeks was a series of forced transfers of Greeks of the Soviet Union that was ordered by Soviet leader Joseph Stalin. It was carried out in 1942, 1944 and 1949 and affected mostly Pontic Greeks along the Black Sea coast resulting in ethnic cleansing of this area. It was estimated that around 50,000 Greeks were deported. At least 15,000 Greeks had died by the end of the deportations. Some scholars characterize the deportation as a genocide against Greeks.

History
The 1926 Soviet census registered 213,765 Greeks in the country and 286,000 in the 1939 census. On 9 August 1937, NKVD order 00485 was adopted to target "subversive activities of Polish intelligence" in the Soviet Union, but was later expanded to also include Latvians, Germans, Estonians, Finns, Greeks, Iranians and Chinese.

There was virtually no counter-revolutionary activity among the Soviet Greeks, though there were exceptions in Constantine Kromiadi, an anti-communist of Greek origin, who became second in command in Andrey Vlasov Abwehr detachment during the Nazi German occupation of the Soviet Union in World War II.

Soviet Greeks were deported in three waves as part of the population transfer in the Soviet Union.
on 29 May 1942, Stalin ordered a deportation of Pontic Greeks and other minorities from the Krasnodar Krai. 1,402 Greeks, including 562 children up to the age of 16, were deported to the east.
shortly after the deportation of the Crimean Tatars, on 2 June 1944 the State Committee for Defense issued the decree N 5984 SS to extend the deportation to other people from Crimea. 15,040 Soviet Greeks were consequently deported from the peninsula (this included 3,350 Greek foreigners with expired passports). Many were sent to the Uzbek SSR. Simultaneously, additional 8,300 Greeks were deported from the Krasnodar Krai and Rostov Region: this operation was perpetrated by Lavrentiy Beria's deputy, Ivan Serov, who arrived from Kerch, and G. Karandadze. A further 16,375 Greeks were relocated from Georgian SSR, Armenian SSR and Azerbaijan SSR and sent to Kazakh SSR and Russian SFSR.
on 29 May 1949, the Soviet Council of Ministers issued the decree N 2214-856 that ordered the relocation of the remaining Greeks, Turks and dashnaks from the Black Sea coast, specifically the Georgian and Armenian SSR. Many were sent to the Kazakh SSR and registered as special settlers. The total number of all these three groups deported by June 1949 was 57,680. Greeks made up 27,000 or 36,000 individuals among this deported groups. The property they left behind was placed under the control of the administrative bodies.

One of the deported Greeks who was born near Sukhumi and sent to the Pahtaral region of Uzbekistan in 1949, recalled the events:

On 25 September 1956, MVD Order N 0402 was adopted and defined the removal of restrictions towards the deported peoples in the special settlements. Afterward, the Soviet Greeks started returning to their homes, or emigrating towards Greece.

Officially, the 1949 deportation was explained by the USSR as trying to cleanse the border areas from "politically unreliable elements". Russian historian Alexander Nekrich assumes that the Greeks were deported in 1949 because of the alliance of Greece with the UK. Others consider it as a collective punishment because the Greek communists lost in the Greek Civil War during 1946-1949.

In 1938, 20,000 Soviet Greeks arrived to Greece. Between 1965 and 1975, another 15,000 Greeks emigrated from the Soviet Union and went to Greece. Unlike many other 'punished' ethnic groups, the Soviet Greeks were never officially rehabilitated by the Soviet legislation. They were however officially rehabilitated, among with other ethnic groups by the Russian Federation, amended by Decree no.  458 of September 12, 2015.

See also
Greek Operation of the NKVD

References

Footnotes

Books and journals
 
 
 
 
 
  
 
 
 
 
 
 
 
 
 

Crimes against humanity
Greek diaspora in Russia
Greek diaspora in Ukraine
Persecution of Greeks in the Soviet Union
Ethnic cleansing in Europe